William Emory Quinby (December 14, 1835 – June 7, 1908) was an American newspaper publisher and diplomat who served as United States Ambassador to the Netherlands.

Early life
Quinby was born in Brewer, Maine, on December 14, 1835. His family moved to Detroit in 1850, where his father Daniel F. Quinby published a magazine, The Literary Miscellany. William Quinby attended Gregory's Business College in Detroit before transferring to the University of Michigan, where he received a Bachelor of Arts degree in 1858. He then studied law, attained admission to the bar and practiced in Detroit for two years. In 1861 he received a Master of Arts degree from the University of Michigan.

Career
Deciding to abandon law for journalism, in 1861 Quinby became a reporter for the Detroit Free Press. By 1872 he had purchased the majority of stock in the paper and advanced to editor-in-chief.

Active in politics as a Democrat, in 1893 President Grover Cleveland nominated him as Ambassador to the Netherlands, where he served until 1897.

In 1896 the University of Michigan awarded him the honorary degree of LL.D. In 1900, Quinby wrote a letter for the Detroit Century Box time capsule.

Personal life
He retired in 1906 and died in Detroit on June 7, 1908. He was buried in Detroit's Elmwood Cemetery.

References

1835 births
1908 deaths
People from Brewer, Maine
Lawyers from Detroit
University of Michigan alumni
Detroit Free Press people
Michigan Democrats
19th-century American diplomats
Ambassadors of the United States to the Netherlands
Businesspeople from Detroit
19th-century American businesspeople
Burials at Elmwood Cemetery (Detroit)